Liquid Monster is the sixth album by the German metal band Brainstorm, released in 2005. The limited edition digipak and the Japanese edition contain a DVD with the documentary Streets, Stages & Studios and bonus tracks.

Track listing
All songs written and arranged by Brainstorm.

 "Worlds Are Comin' Through"  – 4:55 
 "Inside the Monster"  – 4:55  
 "All Those Words"  – 4:05
 "Lifeline"  – 3:05 
 "Invisible Enemy"  – 4:20 
 "Heavenly"  – 5:33 
 "Painside"  – 5:42  
 "Despair to Drown"  – 3:51 
 "Mask of Life"  – 5:20  
 "Even Higher"  – 4:22 
 "Burns My Soul"  – 5:13

Bonus tracks
"Before the Dawn" - 3:25 (Judas Priest cover, digipack edition bonus track)
"Breathe" (Japanese edition bonus track)

Personnel
Band members
Andy B. Franck - lead and backing vocals
Torsten Ihlenfeld - guitars, backing vocals
Milan Loncaric - guitars and backing vocals
Andreas Mailänder - bass
Dieter Bernert - drums

Additional musicians
Ferdy Doernberg- keyboards
Michael 'Miro' Rodenberg - keyboards on tracks 3 and 9
Carmen Schäper - vocals

Production
Achim Köhler - engineer, mixing, mastering
Ingmar Schelzel - engineer, mixing
Dennis Ward - drum editing

References

2005 albums
Brainstorm (German band) albums
Metal Blade Records albums